Charles Thomas Mehan (May 15, 1896 – August 11, 1972) was an American rugby union player who competed in the 1920 Summer Olympics. He was born in Nogales, Arizona and died in Santa Cruz, California. In 1920 he was a member of the American rugby union team, which won the gold medal.

References

External links
 profile

1896 births
1972 deaths
American rugby union players
Rugby union players at the 1920 Summer Olympics
Olympic gold medalists for the United States in rugby
People from Nogales, Arizona
United States international rugby union players
Medalists at the 1920 Summer Olympics